Eugene Joseph "Pete" Turgeon (January 3, 1897 – January 24, 1977) was a shortstop in Major League Baseball. He played for the Chicago Cubs.

References

External links

1897 births
1977 deaths
Major League Baseball shortstops
Chicago Cubs players
Baseball players from Minneapolis